Great Valley School District is located in southeastern Pennsylvania, in the Philadelphia suburbs, specifically in the Delaware Valley region known as the Main Line, in eastern Chester County. The district provides public education for students in Charlestown, East Whiteland, and Willistown townships, as well as Malvern borough. The district is located in the general area known locally as Great Valley. Due to the COVID-19 pandemic, the district operated virtually from March 12, 2020 to August 30, 2021 and had a mask mandate implemented from 2020 to 2022.

Its headquarters are in East Whiteland Township.

District schools
The district includes four elementary schools, a middle school, and a high school.

Charlestown Elementary School
Charlestown Elementary School is located in Malvern, Pennsylvania, within Charlestown Township. Student hours are from 9:00 a.m. to 3:38 p.m.

The school enrolls about 378 students in grades kindergarten through fifth grade per year, and the student–teacher ratio is approximately 14:1. The school building was renovated in the early 2000s, when students and faculty were temporarily relocated.

Christopher Pickell is the school principal.

General Wayne Elementary School
General Wayne Elementary School is located in Malvern, Pennsylvania, within Willistown Township. Student hours are from 8:55 a.m. to 3:33 p.m.

The principal is Dr. Melanie McCarthy.

Kathryn D. Markley Elementary School
The Kathryn Donahue Markley Elementary School, named after a former long-time principal, is located in Malvern, Pennsylvania, within East Whiteland Township. Dr. Marshall Hoffritz is the current principal. Kindergarten through fifth grade students attend the school.

Sugartown Elementary School
Sugartown Elementary School is located in Malvern, Pennsylvania, within Willistown Township.

Dr. Kyle Hammond, former assistant principal at the Great Valley Middle School, was named Sugartown principal in July 2016.

Great Valley Middle School
Great Valley Middle School is located in East Whiteland Township, Pennsylvania, on the same campus as Great Valley High School. The school enrolls about 950 students per year in the sixth through eighth grades. The student to teacher ratio is about 16:1.

The regular student schedule  is 7:40 a.m. to 2:29 p.m. The school also operates on a six-day (1-6) cycle. The principal is Dr. Edward Souders and the assistant principal is Dr. Sharon Cohen.

Great Valley High School

The high school serves students in ninth through twelfth grade. The high school is located on the same campus as the middle school. The principal is Dr. Heidi Capetola and the assistant principals are Mr. Pat Connors and Mr. Henry McCloskey. Mr. Michael Semar, serves as Athletic Director for Great Valley.

School organization
By the 1990s, when the school had three functioning elementary schools, district population growth necessitated construction of a larger middle school and addition of a fourth elementary school. Once the new middle school was completed, the General Wayne facility was closed and converted into the fourth elementary school. Thereafter, Sugartown students temporarily used the renovated General Wayne school to allow for Sugartown's renovation and expansion. Thereafter, the high school underwent a four-year renovation that was completed during the 2006/2007 school year.

After Sugartown's elementary renovation, reassignment of students to schools within the district was necessary. This process began in June 2004 and was implemented in time for the 2006–2007 school year. Some students throughout the district from the other three elementary schools were relocated to Sugartown.

Former schools
Two older elementary schools — Greentree Elementary in Willistown Township and Malvern Elementary in Malvern Borough — were closed in the early 1980s and the buildings sold. Greentree was renovated and enlarged to become a commercial office building while the Malvern school was renovated and enlarged to become the Malvern borough town hall, police station, and public library.

References

External links
 KDM Website
 Sugartown Website
 Charlestown Website
 General Wayne Website
 Middle School Website
 High School Website

School districts in Chester County, Pennsylvania
1962 establishments in Pennsylvania
School districts established in 1962